Ajay Kumar Sharma (born 3 April 1964) is a former Indian cricketer.

Sharma was a prolific run-maker in first-class cricket, mainly for Delhi, scoring over 10,000 runs at the high average of 67.46.

Domestic career 

In the Ranji Trophy, Sharma scored a record 31 centuries and his batting average of approximately 80 in this competition is second only to Vijay Merchant. In the 1996–97 season, he became only the third player to score over 1000 runs in a Ranji Trophy season. He played in six Ranji Trophy finals for Delhi scoring centuries in four of them, but only twice ended up on the winning side (1985–86 and 1991–92). Sharma also regularly represented North Zone in the Duleep Trophy.

International career 

Despite his domestic scoring record, Sharma only played one Test match for India - against the West Indies in January 1988. He played 31 One Day Internationals for India from 1988 to 1993.

In December 1988, he scored back-to-back fifties against New Zealand, but he did not reach those heights again except for a 59 not out (his highest ODI score) against Zimbabwe in March 1993. He finished with 424 runs at a batting average of 20.19. Sharma also took 15 wickets using his left-arm spin with a best of 3/41 against Australia in October 1989.

Life ban 
In 2000, aged 36, his career ended when he received a life ban from cricket after he was implicated in a match-fixing scandal.

In September 2014, Sharma  was cleared from all charges related to match-fixing by Delhi district court and has asked the BCCI to allow him to take part in the board's activities and those of its associates.

He retired from active cricket and is now invested in running multiple franchises of laundry and dry-cleaning brand UClean in Delhi NCR and Punjab.

See also 
 List of cricketers banned for match fixing

References

External links 

1964 births
Living people
Cricketers from Delhi
India One Day International cricketers
India Test cricketers
Indian cricketers
Delhi cricketers
North Zone cricketers
Himachal Pradesh cricketers
Cricketers banned for corruption
Sportspeople banned for life